Croatian Catholic Church can refer to:

 Catholic Church in Croatia
 Greek Catholic Church of Croatia and Serbia
 Old Catholic Church of Croatia

See also 
 Albanian Catholic Church 
 Belarusian Catholic Church
 Bulgarian Catholic Church
 Greek Catholic Church
 Hungarian Catholic Church
 Romanian Catholic Church
 Russian Catholic Church
 Serbian Catholic Church
 Slovak Catholic Church
 Ukrainian Catholic Church